"Widsith" ("far-traveller", lit. "wide-journey"), also known as "The Traveller's Song", is an Old English poem of 143 lines. It survives only in the Exeter Book, a manuscript of Old English poetry compiled in the late-10th century, which contains approximately one-sixth of all surviving Old English poetry. "Widsith" is located between the poems "Vainglory" and "The Fortunes of Men". Since the donation of the Exeter Book in 1076, it has been housed in Exeter Cathedral in southwestern England. The poem is for the most part a survey of the people, kings, and heroes of Europe in the Heroic Age of Northern Europe.

Date of original composition
There is some controversy as to when "Widsith" was first composed. Some historians, such as John Niles, argue that the work was invented after King Alfred's rule to present "a common glorious past", while others, such as Kemp Malone, have argued that the piece is an authentic transcription of old heroic songs. Among the works appearing in the Exeter Book, there are none quite like "Widsith", which may be by far the oldest extant work that gives a historical account of the Battle of the Goths and the Huns, recounted as legends in later Scandinavian works such as the Hervarar saga. Archaeologist Lotte Hedeager argues that "Widsith" goes back to Migration Age-history—at least part of it was composed in the 6th century, and that the author demonstrates familiarity with regions outside of Britain, including Denmark and the Baltic coast.  Hedeager is here in agreement with R.H. Hodgkin and Leonard Neidorf, who argues that "when situated within the history of Anglo-Saxon culture and identity, 'Widsith' clearly belongs to a time prior to the formation of a collective Anglo-Saxon identity, when distinct continental origins were remembered and maintained by the Germanic migrants in the British Isles".

Contents
Excluding the introduction of the scop Widsith, the closing, and brief comments regarded by some scholars as interpolations, the poem is divided into three 'catalogues', so-called thulas.  The first thula runs through a list of the various kings of renown, both contemporary and ancient ("Caesar ruled the Greeks"), the model being '(name of a king) ruled (name of a tribe)'. The second thula contains the names of the peoples the narrator visited, the model being 'With the (name of a tribe) I was, and with the (name of another tribe)'. In the third and final thula, the narrator lists the heroes of myth and legend that he has visited, with the model '(Hero's name) I sought and (hero's name) and (hero's name)'.

The poem refers to a group of people called the Wicinga cynn, which may be the earliest mention of the word "Viking" (lines 47, 59, 80). It closes with a brief comment on the importance and fame offered by poets like Widsith, with many pointed reminders of the munificent generosity offered to tale-singers by patrons "discerning of songs".

The widely travelled poet Widsith (his name simply means "far journey") claims himself to be of the house of the Myrgings, who had first set out in the retinue of "Ealhild, the beloved weaver of peace, from the east out of Angeln to the home of the king of the glorious Goths, Eormanric, the cruel troth-breaker". The Ostrogoth Eormanric was defeated by the Huns in the 4th century. It is moot whether Widsith literally intends himself, or poetically means his lineage, either as a Myrging or as a poet, as when "the fictive speaker Deor uses the rhetoric of first-person address to insert himself into the same legendary world that he evokes in the earlier parts of the poem through his allusions to Wayland the Smith, Theodoric the Goth, Eormanric the Goth, and other legendary figures of the Germanic past".  Historically, we know that one speaker could not travel to see all of these nations in one lifetime. In a similar vein, "I was with the Lidwicingas, the Leonas, and the Langobards", Widsith boasts,
with heathens and heroes and with the Hundingas.
I was with the Israelites and with the Assyrians,
with the Hebrews and the Indians, and with the Egyptians...

The forests of the Vistula in the ancient writing tradition (Widsith, v. 121) are the homeland of the Goths, the material remains of which are generally associated with the Wielbark Culture.

The poem that is now similarly titled "Deor", also from the Exeter Book, draws on similar material.

Tribes of Widsith
The list of kings of tribes is sorted by "fame and importance", according to Hedeager, with Attila of the Huns coming first, followed immediately by Eormanric of the Ostrogoths; by contrast, the Byzantine emperor is number five.

5.
...
15

20

25

30

35

40

45

...
55

60

65

70

75 

80

85

See also
 List of Germanic tribes

Notes

References
 Anglo-Saxon poetry: an anthology of Old English poems tr. S. A. J. Bradley. London: Dent, 1982 (translation into English prose).
 Chambers, R. W. (Ed.). Widsith: A study in Old English heroic legend. Cambridge University Press: Cambridge, 1912.
 Malone, Kemp (Ed.). Widsith. Rosenkilde and Bagger: Copenhagen, 1962.
 Neidorf, Leonard. "The Dating of Widsith and the Study of Germanic Antiquity." Neophilologus 97 (2013): pp. 165–83.
 
 Weiskott, Eric. "The Meter of Widsith and the Distant Past."  Neophilologus.

External links 

 Foys, Martin et al. Old English Poetry in Facsimile Project (Center for the History of Print and Digital Culture, University of Wisconsin-Madison, 2019-); digital facsimile edition and Modern English translation
 Old English text, digitised from George Philip Krapp and Elliott Van Kirk Dobbie (eds), The Exeter Book, The Anglo-Saxon Poetic Records, 3 (New York: Columbia University Press, 1936)
 The original text of the verse with a translation.
 A Verse Translation by Douglas B. Killings
 A translation by Bella Millett
 Norton Anthology of English Literature on-line: "The linguistic and literary contexts of Beowulf"
 
 

Old English poems
English heroic legends